The asp (Leuciscus aspius) is a European freshwater fish of the Cyprinidae family. It is sometimes considered by taxonomic authorities to be one of two members of the genus Aspius. It is protected under Appendix III of the Bern Convention and listed as least concern on the IUCN Red List.

They inhabit lakes and lower reaches of rivers and estuaries. In April to June, asps migrate from lakes to streams for spawning. The eggs attach to rocks, gravel, and water plants. After around two weeks, they hatch and the fry drift downstream to calmer waters. They tend to be active during the evening, when they may create large splashes as they hunt near the surface of the water.

Asps can be found in Estonia, Lithuania, Latvia, Germany, Norway, Sweden, Finland, the Czech Republic, Poland, Ukraine, Bulgaria, Romania, Russia, Switzerland, Slovenia, the Netherlands, and Belgium. In Switzerland, asps have migrated through the Rhine–Main–Danube Canal, as in Serbia, Croatia, Austria, Hungary, and Slovakia. In the eastern regions of Europe, it is a common species in flowing waters, and popular for fly and other types of fishing.

References

External links 
 
 

Cyprinid fish of Asia
Cyprinid fish of Europe
Fish described in 1758
Fish of Russia
Fish of the Caspian Sea
Leuciscus
Taxa named by Carl Linnaeus